Jonas Blue: Electronic Nature – The Mix 2017 is a compilation album by English DJ, record producer and songwriter Jonas Blue. The album was released on 14 July 2017 by Universal Music Group. The album peaked at number 7 on the UK Compilation Chart and number 41 on the Finnish Albums Chart.

Background
The album is a selection of songs from Jonas' DJ sets, combined with his singles "Fast Car", "Perfect Strangers", "By Your Side" and "Mama", and two collaborations (with Mark Villa and EDX). Talking about the album, Jonas said, "I'm so proud to launch my new project Electronic Nature with this special album [...] The concept and vision of Electronic Nature is to give my fans a fully immersive sensory experience of music, visuals and more." The album includes original and official remixes from Galantis, Disciples, Oliver Heldens, Disclosure, Gryffin, Don Diablo and Martin Solveig.

Track listing

Disc one

Disc two

Disc three

Charts

Release history

References

2017 compilation albums
Jonas Blue albums